PhotoIreland (originally PhotoIreland Foundation) is an Irish cultural organisation which organises the annual PhotoIreland Festival, and runs an exhibition space, book shop, and library called The Library Project in Temple Bar, Dublin.

Foundation and development

PhotoIreland Foundation was founded by Ángel Luis González in 2009. It changed its name to PhotoIreland and now runs an annual PhotoIreland Festival and the Halftone print fair. In 2020, it launched the publication Over Journal – the Critical Journal of Photography and Visual Culture for the 21st century. In addition, it runs an art bookshop called The Library Project, which is host to a gallery programme and offers the PhotoIreland collection of photobooks as a resource library in Temple Bar, Dublin.

Working with curator Moritz Neumüller, the organisation held its first annual (month long) "PhotoIreland Festival" in 2010.

The Library Project

The Library Project is a bookshop at 4 Temple Bar Street, Dublin specialising in books on photography, a library and a gallery space. The library contains photo-books, fanzines and magazines relating to photography. It was founded as part of the PhotoIreland Foundation's work in 2011 with the aim of "improving access to specialised photography printed material for purchase or study". It was initially part of a book fair and a collection of material that arose from that event in 2011. PhotoIreland and The Library Project found permanent premises in Temple Bar in 2013.

References

External links 

Arts in Dublin (city)
2009 establishments in Ireland
Libraries in Dublin (city)
Photography museums and galleries in the Republic of Ireland
Irish photography organisations